Sportsklubben Freidig is a Norwegian sports club from Trondheim.

Background 
Founded in 1903, the club has sections for association football, team handball, orienteering and Nordic skiing. In football, it won the League of Norway 1947–48, and, in women's handball, the league in 1971 and 1985. The club has also won several medals in athletics, orienteering and skiing. The senior football section  currently plays in the 2nd Group of Trøndelag Region in 5th division, the 6th level of Norwegian League.

Known athletes
Harald Grønningen, Olav Lian, cross country skiing
Arnfinn Bergmann (ski jumping)
Magnar Solberg (biathlon)
Ingrid Hadler, Stig Berge, Ola Skarholt (orienteering)
Sissel Buchholdt (handball)
 Nils Uhlin Hansen, Kjell Hovik, Odd Bergh (athletics)

References

External links

Football clubs in Norway
Defunct athletics clubs in Norway
Sport in Trondheim
Association football clubs established in 1903
Ski jumping clubs in Norway
1903 establishments in Norway
Orienteering clubs in Norway